Translocation in wildlife conservation is the capture, transport and release or introduction of species, habitats or other ecological material (such as soil) from one location to another.  It contrasts with reintroduction, a term which is generally used to denote the introduction into the wild of species from captive stock. The International Union for the Conservation of Nature (IUCN) catalogues translocation projects for threatened species around the globe.

Overview
Translocation can be an effective management strategy and important topic in conservation biology, but despite their popularity, translocations are a high‐cost endeavor with a history of failures. It may decrease the risk of extinction by increasing the range of a species, augmenting the numbers in a critical population, or establishing new populations. Translocation may also improve the level of biodiversity in the ecosystem.

Translocation may be expensive and is often subject to public scrutiny,  particularly when the species involved is charismatic or perceived as dangerous (for example wolf reintroduction).  Translocation as a tool is used to reduce the risk of a catastrophe to a species with a single population, to improve genetic heterogeneity of separated populations of a species, to aid the natural recovery of a species or re-establish a species where barriers might prevent it from doing so naturally. It is also used to move ecological features out of the way of development.

Several critically endangered plant species in the southwestern Western Australia have either been considered for translocation or trialled. Grevillea scapigera is one such case, threatened by rabbits, dieback and degraded habitat. The rarest marsupial in the world, Gilbert's potoroo, has been successfully translocated to remote islands in Western Australia as "insurance populations".

Translocation is a traditional, if rarely used, conservation tool. However, in this century of rapid climate change it has recently been reframed as assisted migration of narrowly endemic, critically endangered species that are already (or soon expected) to experience climate change beyond their levels of tolerance. Two examples of critically endangered relict species for which assisted migration projects are already underway are the western swamp tortoise of Australia and a subcanopy conifer tree in the United States called Florida torreya.

Types

Introduction

Introduction is the deliberate or accidental translocation of a species into the wild in areas where it does not occur naturally. Introduction of non-native species occurs for a variety of reasons.  Examples are economic gain (Sitka Spruce), controlling crop pests (cane toads), improvement of hunting and fishing (fallow deer), ornamentation of roads (rhododendron) or maintenance (sweet chestnut).  In the past, the costs of translocation introductions of non-native species to ecosystems far outweighed the benefits of them.  For example, eucalyptus trees were introduced in California during the Gold Rush as a fast-growing timber source. By the early 1900s, however, this did not happen because of early harvesting and the splitting and twisting of cut wood. Now the introduction of non-native eucalyptus, particularly in the Oakland Hills is causing competition among native plants and encroaching on habitat for natural wildlife.

Re-introduction
Re-introduction is the deliberate or accidental translocation of a species into the wild in areas where it was indigenous at some point, but no longer at the present. Re-introduction is used as a wildlife management tool for the restoration of an original habitat when it has become altered or species have become extinct due to over-collecting, over-harvesting, human persecution, or habitat deterioration. An example of a successful translocation was the one performed with the plant Narcissus cavanillesii to prevent its flooding due to the construction of a dam.

Re-stocking
Re-stocking is the translocation of an organism into the wild into an area where it is already present. Re-stocking is considered as a conservation strategy where populations have dropped below critical levels and species recovery is questionable due to slow reproductive rates or inbreeding. The World Conservation Union recommends that re-stocking only occur when the causes of population decline have been removed, the area has the capacity to sustain the desired population, and individuals are of the same ecotype as the population into which they are released but not from genetically impoverished or cloned stock.

Insurance populations
Another type of translocation of species is effected in order to create an "insurance population" for a rare species to ensure its future survival, where captive breeding is not an option. Where a population is endangered in its natural wild habitat, it may be translocated to a safer environment.  The primary goal of creating an population is "to capture and maintain representative wild genetic diversity, as well as maintain demographic stability, for as long as possible". They are usually established when the population of the species is already critically low, and one of the many challenges in expanding an insurance population is maintaining its genetic diversity. One of the most well-known examples of insurance populations are those established for the Tasmanian devil, since the first one was established in 2006. The population of the species has been decimated by devil facial tumour disease, and around 600 healthy devils are kept in captivity at zoos, wildlife parks and sanctuaries in Tasmania and on mainland Australia.

Insurance populations are established where predators don't exist or can be kept out, and other environmental dangers such as bushfires can be guarded against. The insurance population can be built up so that re-stocking of the wild population can occur. An example of this is in the management of the critically endangered marsupial, Gilbert's potoroo, in Western Australia. , two populations are being established at remote islands and one within a conservation park in order to conserve the species.

An insurance population of a frog found in central America, the spiny-headed tree frog, is maintained by the El Valle Amphibian Conservation Center in Panama; Atlanta Botanical Garden in the US; and a few AZA zoos.

As well as animal species, insurance populations of plants are cultivated, for example the Royal Botanic Gardens Victoria in Melbourne, Australia, collects seeds of endangered plants from across the state of Victoria, such as Westringia cremnophila.

Trends 

 
Between 1973 and 1989 an estimated 515 translocations occurred per year in the United States, Canada, New Zealand and Australia.  The majority were conducted in the United States. Birds were the most frequently translocated, followed by threatened and endangered species, then non-game species. Of the 261 translocations in the United States reported wild species were most frequently translocated, and the greatest number occurred in the Southeast.

Success and failure

Species translocation can vary greatly across taxa. For instance, bird and mammal translocations have a high success rate, while amphibian and reptile translocations have a low success rate. Successful translocations are characterized by moving a large number of individuals, using a wild population as the source of the translocated individuals, and removing the problems which caused their decline within the area they are being translocated. The translocation of 254 black bears to the Ozark Mountains in Arkansas resulted in more than 2,500 individuals 11 years later and has been seen as one of the most successful translocations in order Carnivora. Another example of successful translocation is the gray wolf translocation in Yellowstone National Park.

Often, when conducting translocation programs, differences in specific habitat types between the source and release sites are not evaluated as long as the release site contains suitable habitat for the species. Translocations could be especially damaging to endangered species citing the failed attempt of Bufo hemiophys baxteri in Wyoming and B. boreas in the Southern Rocky Mountains. For species that have declined over large areas and long periods of time translocations are of little use.  Maintaining a large and widely dispersed population of amphibians and other species is the most important aspect of maintaining regional diversity and translocation should only be attempted when a suitable unoccupied habitat exists. Among plants, the translocation of Narcissus cavanillesii during the construction of the largest European dam (Alqueva dam) is considered one of the best known examples of a successful translocation in plants.

Examples

Western Shield, of Australia, is a nature conservation program which plays an important role in protecting Australia’s native animal population.  More importantly, Western Shield also has programs specialising in translocation of endangered and threatened animals. Founded in 1996, it's the most successful wildlife conservation program in Australia and in 2006, it still remains among the largest in the world. The program has already had significant success: three native mammals in Australia – the woylie, quenda and tammar wallaby – have been removed from the threatened species list, many populations of native animals have recovered or been re-established in their former ranges, and the restoration of ecological processes has begun.  From 1996 to 2000, Western Shield has taken part of 60 translocations, mostly introductions, of 17 species all over the country on private and interstate lands.

South African giraffes were translocated to Senegal, where giraffes had been extirpated by hunting and habitat loss. This is an example of extralimital translocation, where animals were translocated outside their historic and genetic range.

References

Further reading 
 

 

Wildlife conservation